Liss is a Danish band from Aarhus, Denmark. The group released its debut EP, 'Try', in November 2015. The EP received critical acclaim from music publications such as Clash, Noisey and The Fader.

In December 2016, they were selected as part of DIY Magazine's 'Class of 2017'.

Lead singer Søren Holm died on 25 May 2021 at the age of 25.

Members

 Søren Holm – vocals
 Villads Tyrrestrup – bass and vocals
 Vilhelm Strange – guitar
 Tobias Laust – drums

Discography
EPs 
 First (2016)
 Second (2019)
 Third (2020)

Singles
 "Try/Always" (2015)
 "Sorry" (2016)
 "Missed Buses" (2016)
 "Talk to Me" (2019)
 "Reputation" (2019)
 "Waste My Time/Off Today" (2020)
 "Another Window" (2020)
 "Leave Me on the Floor" (2021)
 "Only Kisses" (2021)
 "Precious" (featuring JONES) (2021)

Albums
 "I Guess Nothing Will Be the Same" (2022)

References

Further reading 
Introducing Liss: Surveyors Of Subversive Sub Pop - NME 
New Music: Liss - Try - The Line Of Best Fit

External links

Danish pop music groups